The UCI Juniors World Championships were a set of UCI World Championships events for junior cyclists in 2005 to 2009. In 2010 it was divided into:
The Junior men's road race at the UCI Road World Championships
The UCI Junior Track Cycling World Championships

Championships

See also
 UCI Junior Track Cycling World Championships

References

Juniors